East Gosforth also known as Gosforth East is a former electoral ward in Newcastle upon Tyne, Tyne and Wear, UK. It was created in 2004. The population of the ward is 8,981, increasing to 10,145 at the 2011 Census, 3.5% of the total population of Newcastle upon Tyne. Car ownership in the area is 68.8%, higher than the city average of 54.7%. It was formerly one half of Gosforth's wards, along with the West Gosforth ward.

Education
There are four schools within the East Gosforth ward:
 Archbishop First School
 South Gosforth First School
 Newcastle School for Boys, formally known as Newlands Preparatory School

Recreation and leisure
The ward has two parks, Quarry Park and the 2004 Green Flag Award winner, Gosforth Central Park. The ward has many large green areas including parts of Jesmond Dene.

The ward contains pubs and cafes such as Brandling Villa, Millstone, Job Bulman, Barca and Queen Victoria.

Ward boundary
The boundary of the East Gosforth ward starts at the Blue House roundabout. It continues by heading east along Jesmond Dene Road to the Ouseburn and then north along the Ouseburn to Haddricksmill Bridge. The boundary continues north to the rear of the properties on Ridgewood Crescent and across the Metro line to continue north along the course of the Ouseburn. At the footbridge across the Ouseburn, it heads west around the perimeter of Gosforth Golf Course and continues west along Links Green Walk. It then leads west to the Asda Superstore on the Great North Road. The ward boundary continues south on Great North Road/Gosforth High Street along to the Blue House roundabout, where it ends.

Political 
East Gosforth was formerly represented by 3 Liberal Democrat councillors, Cllr Henry Gallagher, Cllr David Slesenger and Cllr Dominic Raymont . It was also part of Newcastle North Constituency and represented by Labour MP, Catherine Mckinnell.

Charts and tables

The ward has 4,118 housing spaces of which 4.1% are vacant this is lower than the city average of 5.3%. Owner occupied
property stands at 73.9% much higher than the city average of 53.3%. The properties are as follows.

References

External links
 East Gosforth Ward at Newcastle City Council
 East Gosforth Census 2001 at Newcastle City Council

Districts of Newcastle upon Tyne
Wards of Newcastle upon Tyne